Empress Dowager Duan (段太后, personal name unknown) was an empress dowager of the Chinese/Xianbei state Later Yan.  She was a concubine of the founding emperor Murong Chui (Emperor Wucheng), and she was the mother of Murong Xi (Emperor Zhaowen).

Biography
Little is known about her life before Murong Xi became emperor, and although it appears likely that she might be related to Murong Chui's empress Duan Yuanfei, that connection is not completely clear.  After Murong Xi succeeded his nephew Murong Sheng (Emperor Zhaowu) in 401, initially, he did not honor her as empress dowager, as Murong Sheng's mother Empress Dowager Ding was already empress dowager, but after he forced Empress Dowager Ding to commit suicide in 402 over her failed coup attempt, he honored his mother as empress dowager around the new year 404.

In summer 407, after Murong Xi's empress Empress Fu Xunying died, Empress Dowager Duan, for reasons unknown, removed her own empress dowager title and moved out of the palace.  That was the last historical reference to her, and it is not known what happened to her after Murong Xi was killed in a coup by his adoptive nephew Murong Yun (Emperor Huiyi) later that year.

Later Yan empresses dowager
4th-century births
5th-century deaths